The 2011 FIBA Asia Championship for Men is the intercontinental championship for basketball organized by FIBA Asia that doubles as a qualifying tournament for the men's basketball tournament of the 2012 Summer Olympics in London, England, United Kingdom. The tournament was held in 15–25 September 2011 at Wuhan, Hubei, China. Lebanon was the original host for the event. Team China won the tournament, defeating Jordan 70–69 in the final. It was the first time in the history of FIBA Asia Championship that the title was won by just one single point.

Qualification

According to the FIBA Asia rules, each zone had two berths, and the host nation China and FIBA Asia Stanković Cup champions Lebanon were automatically qualified. The other four places are allocated to the zones according to performance in the 2010 FIBA Asia Stanković Cup. Therefore, with Lebanon, Japan, Qatar and the Philippines finishing in the top four in that tournament, West Asia, East Asia, the Gulf and Southeast Asia were all given one additional qualifying berth per zone.

Among qualified teams from 2009, Sri Lanka did not qualify in the tournament, while Kazakhstan and Kuwait did not participate. The three returning teams are Bahrain, which qualified in 2009 but withdrew, Syria which did not participate in 2009, and Malaysia which last participated in 2005.

Draw

The draw was held on July 6 at Wuhan. The four semifinalists of the 2010 FIBA Asia Stanković Cup of the last year were seeded into four different groups, and the draw decided which group each of them will figure. Then one Middle Asia was drawn into Group A, the other Middle Asia into B, Indonesia and United Arab Emirates into C and D. The next four were Malaysia, Chinese Taipei, Syria and Bahrain in order. Finally, hosts China chose Group D, after which Iran, Jordan and Korea were drawn into Group B, C, A, respectively.

The following is the distribution of the pots prior the draw, with teams sorted by their FIBA World Ranking (Bahrain is unranked); teams from each pot cannot be drawn together.

 The draw was conducted before the qualifiers from Middle Asia were known. India (ranked 50th) won the qualifiers from the SAARC while Uzbekistan (ranked 58th) was the qualifier from the "Stans" countries.

Venues

Two arenas in Wuhan, Wuhan Gymnasium and Hongshan Gymnasium, were used in the championship. Wuhan Gymnasium was the primary venue.

Squads 

Each team has a roster of twelve players. Only one naturalized player per team is allowed by FIBA.

Preliminary round

Group A

Group B

 Qatar lost the game against Uzbekistan by default after being left with only one eligible player. Uzbekistan were ahead 27–12 with 4:02 left in the first quarter when the game was called off.
 Qatar lost the game against Iran by default after being left with only one eligible player. Iran were ahead 40–4 with 2:18 left in the first quarter when the game was called off.

Group C

Group D

Second round
 The results and the points of the matches between the same teams that were already played during the preliminary round shall be taken into account for the second round.

Group E

Group F

Classification 13th–16th

Semifinals

15th place

13th place

Classification 9th–12th

Semifinals

11th place

9th place

Final round

Quarterfinals

Semifinals 5th–8th

Semifinals

7th place

5th place

3rd place

Final

Final standing

Awards

Most Valuable Player:  Yi Jianlian

All-Star Team:

 PG –  Sam Daghlas
 SG –  Takuya Kawamura
 SF –  Samad Nikkhah Bahrami
 PF –  Yi Jianlian
 C –  Hamed Haddadi

Statistical leaders

Points

Rebounds

Assists

Steals

Blocks

References

External links
 
 Competition schedule

 
2011
2011–12 in Asian basketball
2011–12 in Chinese basketball
International basketball competitions hosted by China
September 2011 sports events in China